The Dallin House (also known as Thomas and Jane Dallin House) is a historic residence in Springville, Utah, United States. It was listed on the National Register of Historic Places in 1994.

Description
The house is located within the boundaries of Springville Historic District. It was built in c. 1905. The residence is significant for its association with sculptor Cyrus E. Dallin (1861-1944).

See also

 National Register of Historic Places in Utah County, Utah
 Taylor-Dallin House, Arlington, Massachusetts, also significant and NRHP-listed for association with Dallin.
 Cyrus E. Dallin Art Museum

References

External links

Houses completed in 1905
Houses on the National Register of Historic Places in Utah
Houses in Utah County, Utah
Victorian architecture in Utah
National Register of Historic Places in Utah County, Utah
Buildings and structures in Springville, Utah
Individually listed contributing properties to historic districts on the National Register in Utah
Cyrus Edwin Dallin
1905 establishments in Utah